Dino Butorac (born October 8, 1990) is a Croatian basketball player who last played for Þór Þorlákshöfn of the Icelandic Úrvalsdeild karla. During his career he has won the Swedish Basketball League twice, in 2014 and 2015, and the Bosnia and Herzegovina Basketball League in 2012.

Playing career
In September 2011, he signed with HKK Široki in Bosnia. He won both the Bosnian Cup and the league championship.

In July 2012, he signed a contract with KK Jolly JBS in Croatia where he reached semifinals and lost against KK Cibona who ended winning the title.

Sodertalje Kings was the next stop in 2013 where he ended up playing 2 seasons and won the championship both times. In the second year with the team he had a key role in the playoffs averaging 15 points. Next stop was Hungarian team Falco Szombathely where averaged 10.6 points and 3 rebounds but ended the season with English team Plymouth Raiders.

Butorac spent the 2015–2016 season with. Falco KC Szombathely of the Nemzeti Bajnokság I/A. 

In August 2018, Butorac signed with Tindastóll of the Icelandic Úrvalsdeild karla. During his Úrvalsdeild debut, he posted a triple-double with 12 points, 10 rebounds and 11 assists. For the season he averaged 11.4 points, 3.9 rebounds and 3.4 assists in 27 regular season and playoffs games.

In October 2019, Butorac returned to the Úrvalsdeild and signed with Þór Þorlákshöfn where he replaced Vladimir Nemcok. For the season, he averaged 8.4 points, 4.2 rebounds and 4.3 assists.

National team career
Croatian national team : 
3rd place World Champhionship U19, New Zealand (2009) 
4th place European Championship U20, Croatia (2010)

Awards and accomplishments

Club honours
Swedish champion (2): 2014, 2015
Bosnia and Herzegovina Basketball champion: 2012
Bosnia and Herzegovina Cup: 2012

References

External links
Profile on realgm.com
Profile on eurobasket.com
Profile on fibaeurope.com 
Icelandic statistics at kki.is

1990 births
Living people
Croatian men's basketball players
People from Požega, Croatia
Rostock Seawolves players
Shooting guards
Södertälje Kings players
HKK Široki players
OKK Spars players
Ungmennafélagið Tindastóll men's basketball players
Úrvalsdeild karla (basketball) players
Þór Þorlákshöfn (basketball club) players
KK Jazine Arbanasi players